Filomicrobium  is a genus of bacteria from the family of Hyphomicrobiaceae which was first described in 1987 by Schlesner

References

Hyphomicrobiales
Bacteria genera